Louise Beaumont (born January 23, 1959) is a former Canadian handball player who competed in the 1976 Summer Olympics.

Born in Granby, Quebec, Beaumont was part of the Canadian handball team, which finished sixth in the Olympic tournament. She played four matches and scored two goals.

References
 profile

1959 births
Canadian female handball players
Handball players at the 1976 Summer Olympics
Living people
Olympic handball players of Canada
People from Granby, Quebec
Sportspeople from Quebec
French Quebecers